Aaron Jamal Brewer (born October 28, 1997) is an American football guard for the Tennessee Titans of the National Football League (NFL). He played college football at Texas State, and signed with the Titans as an undrafted free agent in 2020.

College career
Brewer earned All-District 9-6A First-team honors playing offensive guard at Skyline High School in Dallas, Texas. Rivals.com rated him as a two-star recruit. Brewer received offers for play for Sam Houston State and Texas State. He ultimately accepted the offer to play at Texas State under head coach Everett Withers, a former defensive backs coach for the Tennessee Titans. In his freshman season, Brewer played in all twelve Texas State games and made eleven starts. In his next three seasons, Brewer started all of the team's 36 games. He earned All-Sun Belt Conference selections every year in college. In his junior year, Pro Football Focus ranked Brewer as the Sun Belt's best run blocker and second-best pass blocker. In his senior season, Brewer received a grade of 82.8 by Pro Football Focus, ranking highest in the conference, and was named to the All-Sun Belt second-team.

Professional career

After going unselected in the 2020 NFL Draft, Brewer signed as an undrafted free agent with the Tennessee Titans on May 7, 2020. On September 5, 2020, Brewer earned a spot on the Titans' initial 53-player roster. On November 22, 2020, Brewer recorded his first start of his career when he started at left guard for the Titans against the Baltimore Ravens. He played all 70 offensive snaps in the 30–24 overtime victory. Brewer, along with the rest of the offensive line, helped Titans running back Derrick Henry rush for 133 yards, including a game-winning 33-yard touchdown. Brewer was placed on the reserve/COVID-19 list by the team on January 7, 2021, and activated on January 18.
On October 8, 2021, Brewer was placed on injured reserve. He was activated on November 6.

Having previously played more of a reserve role or starting in relief of injuries for his first two seasons, Brewer became the full time starting left guard in the 2022 season; starting all 17 games.

Entering the 2023 offseason as a restricted free agent, the Titans placed a second round tender on Brewer on March 15, 2023.

References

External links
 Texas State Bobcats bio
 Tennessee Titans bio

1997 births
Living people
Players of American football from Dallas
American football centers
Texas State Bobcats football players
Tennessee Titans players